JAI (Jamna Auto Industries Limited) is an Indian multinational suspension system automotive company headquartered in Delhi, India. JAI produces various types of springs, including tapered or multileaf, parabolic spring, lift axle suspension, and air suspension systems.   JAI manufacturing units are found in Yamuna Nagar, Malanpur (near Gwalior), Chennai, Hosur (near Bangalore), Rudrapur, and Jamshedpur. JAI products are sold in over 25 countries.

History
Bhupinder Singh Jauhar started the spring business in 1954 in a small shop in Yamuna Nagar.

The company has diversified its range by adding lift axle and air suspension products under technical collaboration with Ridewell Corporation, USA.

The Company is the market leader with 66% market share in the India OEM segment, producing over 410 modes of springs for OEMs.

Domestic after market operations are overseen by subsidiary entity i.e., Jai Suspension Systems LLP. The LLP has expanded its presence across 390 towns in the country with the product range of over 4,200-part numbers.

The Company has indigenous R&D Centre recognized by the Department of Scientific and Industrial Research for its capability to design multi, parabolic leaf springs, lift axles, and air suspension for all automobile applications. The R&D Centre has facility of in-house validation and testing of products using a servo actuator to simulate actual vehicle conditions.

Operations
 
The Company has eight manufacturing facilities located at Yamuna Nagar, Malanpur (near Gwalior), Chennai (two units – Maraimalai Nagar & Pillaipakkam), Jamshedpur, Hosur, Pune, and Pant Nagar (under subsidiary entity). In six of the plants mainly automotive springs are manufactured.
Its wholly owned subsidiary, Jai Suspension Systems LLP (JSSLLP) has a plant at Pant Nagar in Uttarakhand.

Products
Jamna Auto Industries Limited designs and manufactures wide range of springs to meet requirements of:
 Heavy commercial vehicles
 Medium commercial vehicles
 Light commercial vehicles
 Sport utility vehicles
 Trailers and Air suspension systems

Customers
Jamna Auto exports automotive parts to more than 50 companies in over 25 countries. Some of the large customers of JAI are as follows:
 Tata Motors, India
 Ashok Leyland, India
 Suzuki, Japan
 Asia MotorWorks, India
 Volvo, Sweden
 General Motors, USA
 Toyota, Japan
 Ford Motor Company, USA
 Daimler AG, Germany
 UD Trucks, Japan

References

External links 

Companies based in New Delhi
Automotive companies of India
Indian companies established in 1954
Manufacturing companies established in 1954
Companies listed on the National Stock Exchange of India
Companies listed on the Bombay Stock Exchange